For the tobacco factory in Southville, Bristol see Tobacco Factory.

A tobacco factory is where tobacco is processed and cured to make it ready for use as an ingredient in the tobacco sold and used in smoking pipes, cigarettes, cigars, chewing tobacco and "snuff" (dipping tobacco). Tobacco factories employed many people in Cuba, Ybor City, West Tampa, and other tobacco producing areas. Many of the buildings remain. The factory building along with stemmery buildings and warehouses are used in the manufacturing process of tobacco products.

A 1904 catalog from the Louisiana Purchase Exposition record many tobacco factories in the Philippines at the time.

Tobacco factory buildings include
Royal Tobacco Factory
Duke Homestead and Tobacco Factory
Sarajevo Tobacco Factory
Wentzville Tobacco Company Factory
Michelides Tobacco Factory
Brooklyn Tobacco Factory
Moss Tobacco Factory
Bull Durham Tobacco factory, part of W. T. Blackwell and Company
TOP Tobacco Factory in North Carolina
Tobacco Factory, Bristol

References

Tobacco
Tobacco buildings